Isoemericellin is a bio-active isolate of the marine fungus Emericella variecolor.

External links
 Evariquinone, isoemericellin, and stromemycin from a sponge derived strain of the fungus Emericella variecolor

Biomolecules